The Canadian Senators Group is a parliamentary group of senators in the Senate of Canada founded on November 4, 2019, by eight senators from the Independent Senators Group, two from the Conservative Party of Canada's Senate caucus, and one non-affiliated senator. The group named Scott Tannas as its interim leader and Josée Verner as interim deputy leader, though the actual caucus leadership roles and role titles have yet to be announced.

History 
The caucus was formed on November 4, 2019.

In an interview with CTV News' Don Martin, Tannas said that the motivation for him and at least several other senators to depart the ISG was a perceived lack of independence in the contentious spring 2019 legislation related to west coast oil tanker moratoriums and other oil and gas-related legislation. Additionally, Tannas cited the concern that the Independent Senators Group, then numbering 58 Senators, had become too large, and that a "wider range of views and approaches" was needed. In addition, in an effort to avoid "groupthink", CSG interim leader Senator Scott Tannas announced that the initial founding members of the group had agreed to cap membership in the group to no more than 25 members. Also included among the reasons for the founding of a second, non-partisan, and independent Senate caucus was a perennially renewed effort to focus on regional issues, despite this notionally being the constitutionally-enshrined purpose of the Senate as a whole.

Included among those decamping to the Canadian Senators Group was Elaine McCoy, who previously served as the ISG's founding facilitator from 2016 to 2017.

On November 18, 2019, two more senators joined the CSG: Percy Downe, formerly of the Progressive Senate Group and Senate Liberal Caucus; and Jean-Guy Dagenais, a Conservative. Downe said he still supported the Liberal Party but liked the "diversity of views" in the CSG; while Dagenais cited disagreements with the leadership of Andrew Scheer, particularly Scheer's social views and the "low importance" he placed on Quebec, as the reasons for his defection.

On February 4, 2022, Dennis Patterson joined the CSG, departing the Conservative caucus. The "last straw" was disappointment that members of the party weren't condemning the Freedom Convoy.

On August 4, 2022, Larry Smith left the Conservative caucus to join the CSG. Smith clarified that he would remain a member of the Conservative Party.

Leadership 

Leader: Scott Tannas (since November 4, 2019)
Deputy leader: Dennis Patterson (since March 21, 2022)
Liaison: Percy Downe (since November 20, 2019)
Deputy liaison: Stephen Greene (since May 17, 2022)
Chair: Robert Black (since November 20, 2019)

Former leadership
Deputy leader: Josée Verner (November 4, 2019 – May 13, 2021)

Membership

Former members

See also 
Independent Senators Group
Progressive Senate Group
Senate Liberal Caucus

External links 
Canadian Senators Group

References 

 
Senate of Canada
Independent politicians in Canada
2019 establishments in Canada
Technical parliamentary groups
Parliamentary groups in Canada
Political organizations established in 2019